Roopa, known as Roopa Devi is an Indian actress who has acted in Kannada, Tamil, Telugu and Malayalam films. She is the daughter of Kalyanam Raghuramaiah and veteran actress Advani Lakshmi Devi. She became famous as the debutante heroine of the tragic romantic film Oru Thalai Ragam in Tamil that ran for 365 days in which she was paired with newcomer Shankar. For her performance in the movie Avala Antharanga, Roopa won the Karnataka State Film Award for Best Actress in 1984–85.

Career
Devi mainly worked in Kannada movies during the 1980s. She debuted in the experimental film Kamala in 1979 and her role of a prostitute brought her wide critical appreciation. She entered commercial cinema in 1980 with Simha Jodi in which she played the role of Vishnuvardhan's sister. She was the first choice for second lead and supporting roles in Kannada movies during 1983–87. Her prominent Kannada movies include Haalu Jenu, Mullina Gulabi, Bandhana, Avala Antharanga, Marali Goodige, Trishoola, Aahuthi, Dharma and Bala Nouke. She has won the Karnataka State Film Award for Best Actress (1984–85) for her performance in Avala Antharanga.

She has worked with almost all leading Kannada actors of her time including Dr.Rajkumar, Kalyan Kumar, Vishnuvardhan, Srinath, Ambareesh, Anant Nag, Shankar Nag and Lokesh. She was paired with matinee idol Dr.Rajkumar in Haalu Jenu, Samayada Gombe and Yarivanu which were all huge successes critically and commercially. She stopped acting after 1989. Almost twenty years later she returned to the silver screen with Ganga Kaveri in 2008. In 2011 she acted in Jarasandha as the mother of hero Duniya Vijay.

Dr.Rajkumar holds the distinction of having played the hero to both Roopa Devi and her mother Advani Lakshmi Devi (in Sri Ramanjaneya Yuddha).

Filmography

References

External links

Living people
Indian film actresses
Actresses in Tamil cinema
Actresses in Malayalam cinema
Actresses in Kannada cinema
20th-century Indian actresses
Year of birth missing (living people)
Actresses in Telugu cinema